Aralia tibetana is a species of plant in the family Araliaceae. It is endemic to Tibet.

References

tibetana
Flora of Tibet
Endemic flora of China
Vulnerable plants
Taxonomy articles created by Polbot
Plants described in 1965